The Chicago Rush were a professional arena football team based in Rosemont, Illinois. The team  played at the Allstate Arena from 2001 to 2013. They were a member of the Central Division of the National Conference of the Arena Football League (AFL). Founded in 2001, the team qualified for the playoffs 11 out of 12 seasons and won one AFL championship, ArenaBowl XX in 2006. During their history, the Rush won five divisional titles and competed in the AFL Conference Championship six times, including four consecutive appearances from 2004 to 2007. They also had the largest market in the AFL.

After the 2013 season, the Rush announced that their operations were suspended and are currently not part of the Arena Football League.  The team's roster was liquidated in a dispersal draft.

History

Founding
The Rush made its AFL debut in 2001. The team played its home games at the Allstate Arena (formerly known as the Rosemont Horizon), the same venue previously used by the Chicago Bruisers, one of the four original Arena Football League teams.

2001–2005
The Rush have made the playoffs every year in the franchise's short history, and so far, they have made one ArenaBowl appearance. Mike Hohensee was the franchise's first coach, and he remained the Rush's only coach until becoming the head coach of the Philadelphia Soul in 2011. One year after, Hohensee left the Soul to coach the Iowa Barnstormers.

In their inaugural year (2001), the Rush finished the regular season 7–7 and won their very first playoff game, beating the Orlando Predators 41–26, but lost to the eventual ArenaBowl XV champion Grand Rapids Rampage 53–21. The team featured young players that would become Rush fixtures and fan favorites in the years to come, such as quarterback Billy Dicken, Joe Douglass, Damien Porter and Jamie McGourty, and Riley Kleinhesselink, Cedric Walker, and Anthony Ladd.

In 2002, the Rush won the Central division with a 9–5 record and received a bye in the playoffs. Dicken returned at quarterback and Chicago added Antonio Chatman who was named to the All-Rookie team as the team's main wide receiver and return man. Chicago added defensive linemen John Moyer and James Baron. They defeated the Dallas Desperados 60–47, but fell in the semifinals to the Arizona Rattlers 46–35.

In 2003, the AFL expanded from 14 games to 16. Dicken was the team's quarterback, but missed time after breaking his jaw in the middle of the season. Antonio Chatman broke Rush franchise records for All-Purpose and Return Yards. He caught 123 passes for 1,636 yards and 29 touchdowns. On special teams, he netted 2,062 return yards and got into the end zone seven times. Chicago also signed DeJuan Alfonzo early in the season from the Indiana Firebirds. Alfonzo would be with the team until 2010. Chicago also signed FB/LB Bob McMillen, who would play with the team until 2007 and became the Rush's head coach in 2011. After starting the season 0–3, the Rush finished 8–5 and got into the playoffs as a Wild Card Team. After the team's 0-3 start, Chicago squared off against the 3-0 Los Angeles Avengers, facing off against Tony Graziani and the league's top ranked offense. Dameon Porter sealed the win with a key interception at the goal line with one minute left to play. The victory turned around the Rush season. But to make the postseason, Chicago needed to defeat the Indiana Firebirds on the final day of the regular season, the Rush won 46–43, in overtime. For the first time in franchise history, Chicago did not win a playoff game, and fell in the Wild Card Game to the New York Dragons 48–45. After the season, Chatman went to the NFL, signing with the Green Bay Packers.

In 2004, the Rush signed Raymond Philyaw as its franchise quarterback. Philyaw was known for his efficiently and record touchdown-interception ratio, a crucial stat in the AFL, where turnovers are key. In 2004, Philyaw threw just four interceptions. Chicago started the year 4–0, its best start in franchise history. The Rush won the Central division with an 11–5 record. They won their first-round game 59–49 over the Orlando Predators, but they fell in the semifinals to the eventual ArenaBowl XVIII champion San Jose SaberCats 49–35. Chicago led early in the game, but Philyaw tore his ACL on a scramble, and the Rush could not overtime the injury.

In 2005, they went to the AFL playoffs as the #3 seed in the American Conference. They won the conference semifinal over the Los Angeles Avengers 52–45, but ended up losing the American Conference Championship Game to the eventual ArenaBowl XIX Champion Colorado Crush in overtime, with a final score of 49–43. That game became known as the "Confetti Game", due to an arena employee firing a confetti cannon prematurely, when the game was extended due to a defensive penalty on the final play. After a ten-minute delay to clean the confetti, the Rush were able to tie the game on the untimed down, forcing the overtime period.

2006: ArenaBowl XX champions
In 2006, despite their first losing record of 7–9, the Rush got into the playoffs, receiving the #5 seed in the American Conference.

In the off-season, signed former Heisman Trophy finalist Michael Bishop and Matt D'Orazio to fight to be the team's starting quarterback, and D'Orazio got the game. During the regular season, Chicago started the year at 0–2, but during the season, the Rush picked up defensive back Jeremy Unertl and offensive specialist Bobby Sippio. Both made huge impacts on their respective sides of the ball.

With a 5–9 record, the Rush won its last two games of the regular season to get a playoff spot. In the playoffs, the Rush managed to pull off key upsets. In the Wild Card Round, the Rush defeated the fourth-seeded Nashville Kats 55–47. In the Divisional Round, Chicago managed to pull off a huge upset by taking down the defending champion Colorado Crush, 63–46. In the Conference Championship they upset the second-seeded San Jose SaberCats 59–56, giving the Rush their very first ArenaBowl appearance in franchise history.

In ArenaBowl XX, the Rush defeated the Orlando Predators, 69–61, to give Chicago their first Arena Bowl title. Quarterback Matt D'Orazio was Offensive Player of the Game, wide receiver/defensive back Dennison Robinson took Defensive Player of the Game honors, and fullback/linebacker Bob McMillen was named the Ironman of the Game. With the win, the Rush became the first team with a losing regular-season record to win a championship in any sport since the 1937–38 Chicago Blackhawks.

2007–2008
In 2007, the team won the American Conference Central Division with a record of 12–4. D'Orazio was the team's quarterback and Bobby Sippio, in his first full season with the Rush caught 125 passes for 1,742 yards and 53 passes. After the season, Sippio would sign with the Kansas City Chiefs. They defeated the L.A. Avengers on June 9, 2007 in the divisional finals. They then played the San Jose SaberCats for the conference final, yet they came up short losing 61–49.

In 2008, the Rush made a free agency splash by signing AFL legends Sherdrick Bonner and Damian Harrell. The Rush opened its 2008 campaign against the defending ArenaBowl XXI champion San Jose Sabercats. Chicago convincingly defeated the Sabercats 70–47 in front of 15,409 fans at the Allstate Arena. Injuries allowed Russ Michna to become the team's starter over Bonner. Harrell, Donovan Morgan, and Travis LaTendresse would all post 1,000-yard receiving seasons. En route to an 11–5 season, Chicago locked up the conference's top seed and home field advantage for the entire playoffs. It was the first time Chicago had home field advantage and the Rush had never lost a home playoff game, going 3–0. The Grand Rapids Rampage drew Chicago in the divisional round. The Rampage finished the regular season 6–10 but stunned the Rush and 14,338 fans 58–41. The Rampage would lose a week later to the Sabercats at the HP Pavilion.

2009: Arena Football League restructuring
In 2009, the Arena Football League suspended operations to refinance and restructure its business plan. After a one-year layoff, the AFL and Chicago Rush returned in 2010 with a single entity model.

The rebirth: 2010
On December 10, 2009, it was announced that the Rush would be returning for 2010 under new ownership as a member of Arena Football 1.  The ownership obtained the rights to the name after a court auction granted the AF1 control of the AFL's assets.  Two months later, the AF1 decided to adopt the former Arena Football League name.

The 2010 Rush roster would feature many new faces. However, former Rush players quarterback Russ Michna, jack linebacker/wide receiver DeJuan Alfonzo, and linemen Joe Peters, Robert Boss, and Beau Elliot rejoined the team. Also on the roster was wide receiver Samie Parker, Thaddeus Coleman, and kicker Chris Gould.

Chicago returned to the field on April 2, 2010 on the road against the Iowa Barnstormers. The game was broadcast on the NFL Network and Chicago won 61–43.  The Rush began the season 4–0 and were in first place in the division at 10–4. However, the team lost its last two games, first to the 1–13 Dallas Vigilantes and then closed out the year on the road losing to the Spokane Shock. It cost the team a chance at the division title and forced the team to go on the road for the playoffs. The team ended the regular season at 10–6, and lost to the Milwaukee Iron in the playoffs.

2011: Ten year anniversary
The Rush celebrated its 10th season in 2011. Bob McMillen replaced Mike Hohensee to become the team's second head coach in team history, and Russ Michna returned at quarterback. Chicago finished the regular season with a 13–5 record and finished first in the Central Division. It was the most regular season wins in Rush history, breaking the 2007 team's 12-4 mark. Defensive back Vic Hall broke AFL record for interceptions in a season with 15, doing it as a rookie. The Rush defense led the league in points allowed (46.3 per game) and broke league records for the most turnovers (56) and interceptions (42) in a season. Wide receiver Reggie Gray finished the year with the most catches (130) and receiving yards (1,969) in franchise history, and tied the Rush record with 53 total touchdowns. Bobby Sippio held the old records. Chicago defeated the Dallas Vigilantes at Allstate Arena in the first round of the playoffs, but the Rush season ended the following week, falling to the Arizona Rattlers in the National Conference Championship Game. Arizona advanced to ArenaBowl XXIV, but lost to the Jacksonville Sharks in the championship. For the Rush, it marked the sixth time in franchise history the team had advanced to the AFL Conference Championships.

2012: AFL's Silver Anniversary
The 2012 season marked the AFL's 25th season and number 11 for the Rush. The ownership group, Chicago Gridiron LLC, declared bankruptcy before the season started and abandoned the team. The league stepped in and ran the Rush during the 2012 season. Chicago began the year with a 70–48 home victory against the Tampa Bay Storm on March 10 at Allstate Arena. In 2012, the Rush re-signed quarterback Russ Michna, the franchises all-time leading passer, 2011 Second Team All-Arena WR Reggie Gray and 2011 AFL Defensive Player of the Year DB Vic Hall, jack linebacker Kelvin Morris, and offensive lineman T.J. Watkins.

2013: New ownership and league takeover, twice each
On November 12, 2012, the Chicago Rush were purchased by a group, headed by Julee White of Testarossa Entertainment, but the purchase was terminated by the AFL three months later due to the ownership's failure to meet league obligations.

On February 7, 2013, the Rush were purchased by Star Rush Football, LLC, an ownership led by private-equity firm manager David Staral Jr.  Weeks later, they finalized a deal with Allstate Arena in Rosemont to play all but two home games.  The other two home games (June 8 against the Utah Blaze and June 15 versus the San Antonio Talons) will be played at the BMO Harris Bank Center in Rockford, Illinois, which hosted the first "test game" for the AFL in 1986. One week before the season opener, the new ownership group introduced the team's new logo and uniforms, which removed the gray from the logo and replaced it with red.

In May 2013, David Staral Jr. bounced a check needed to secure Allstate Arena for two upcoming home games. Upon the news, the AFL took over control of the franchise.  Staral later pleaded guilty to Federal bankruptcy and wire fraud charges for concealing that he was undergoing bankruptcy proceedings while in negotiations to buy the team.

2013 Playoffs: Rushed out of Spokane

On August 1, 2013 the Rush traveled to Spokane, Washington to play the 14-4 Spokane Shock in the first round of the AFL playoffs. They lost to Spokane, 69–47. Three costly turnovers in the fourth quarter sealed the deal. Spokane went on to win another playoff game.

The league has announced that the Rush did not sign a two-year commitment form to play in 2014 or 2015, thus will sit out until further notice. The team's roster was liquidated in a dispersal draft.

Notable players

Retired uniform numbers

Arena Football Hall of Famers

All-Arena players
The following Rush players were named to All-Arena Teams:
 WR Reggie Gray (3), Damian Harrell (1), Bobby Sippio (1)
 WR/DB Dameon Porter (2)
 C Billy Eisenhardt (1), Beau Elliot (1)
 OL/DL John Moyer (4), James Baron (1), Khreem Smith (1)
 JLB DeJuan Alfonzo (3), Kelvin Morris (1)
 DB Vic Hall (1), Dennison Robinson (1), Jeremy Unertl (1)
 K Chris Gould (1)
 OS Antonio Chatman (1)

Notable coaches

Head coaches
Note: Statistics are correct through the end of Week 1 the 2013 Arena Football League season.

Media coverage
The Chicago Rush originally had games broadcast on the now defunct Fox Sports Net Chicago during its first two seasons from 2001–02 with mostly Saturday night telecasts. When the AFL signed with NBC from 2003–06, the Rush was one of the most prominently featured teams during the national NBC broadcasts as well as playoff games and the majority of Chicago's games moved to Sunday afternoons. A few of the games not picked up by NBC remained on FSN Chicago until 2006. Beginning in the 2007 season, the AFL began a TV partnership with ESPN and FSN Chicago went under and Comcast SportsNet Chicago took its place. Once again the Rush were widely featured during the national ESPN telecasts on Monday nights and Sunday afternoons.

The regional telecasts went to Comcast SportsNet. From 2001 to 2008, the Rush games were broadcast by Tom Dore and former Chicago Bears offensive lineman James "Big Cat" Williams. The radio deals bounced between 670 The Score and ESPN Radio 1000.

When the Rush returned in 2010, the AFL signed its TV deal with NFL Network, but the Rush were not featured as often as they had been with ESPN and NBC, averaging between 2 and 3 telecasts a year on NFL Network in 2010 and 2011, but were shutout from the national spotlight in 2012. Occasionally region games air on CSN and WGN's CLTV, and all AFL games are streamed for free online through UStream.
Online Radio and TV Broadcasts were handled by former Chicago Bruisers Broadcaster Les Grobstein in 2010 through 2013 without a color commentator.

Awards and records 
This section contains all records, awards, and honors acquired by Rush players in individual seasons. Career records weren't included as not all players spent career with Rush

Team awards
 Chicago Rush
 Commissioner's Award
 2004, 2007

Player awards
 DeJuan Alfonzo
 2006
 All-Ironman Team WR/LB
 2007
 Assists Season Leaders, 49
 Fumble Returns Season Leaders, 5
 Interception Yards Season Leaders, 147
 Interception TDs Season Leaders, 3
 First Team All-Arena JLB
 All-Ironman Team WR/LB
2010
AFL Ironman of the Year
AFL All-Arena First Team, Jack Linebacker
AFL All-Arena First Team, Ironman
 James Baron
 2002
 First Team All-Arena OL/DL
 Antonio Chatman
 2002
 All-Rookie Team OS
 2003
 Kick Returns Season Leaders, 84
 Kick Return Yards Season Leaders, 2062
 Kick Return TDs Season Leaders, 7
 Second Team All-Arena OS
 Matt D'Orazio
 2006
 Completion Percentage Season Leaders (min. 150 Attempts), 70.3%
 ArenaBowl XX Offensive Player of the Game
 2007
 QB Rating Season Leaders (min. 150 Attempts), 126.24
 Completion Percentage Season Leaders (min. 150 Attempts), 69.1%
 Dan Frantz
 2007
 Extra Points (1 pt) Season Leaders, 104
 Keith Gispert
 2003
 All-Rookie Team K
 2005
 FG Percentage Season Leaders (min. 15 Attempts), 61.1%
 Jamie McGourty
 2002
 TD/Rush Pct. Season Leaders (min. 25 rushes), 34.5
 Bob McMillen
 2004
 Rushes Season Leaders, 79
 Rushing Yards Season Leaders, 285
 Rushing TDs Season Leaders, 22
 All-Ironman Team FB/LB
 2006
 ArenaBowl XX Ironman of the Game
 Etu Molden
 2004
 All-Rookie Team WR/LB
 2005
 All-Ironman Team WR/LB
 John Moyer
 2002
 Second Team All-Arena OL/DL
 2003
 Sacks Season Leaders, 9.0
 First Team All-Arena OL/DL
 All-Ironman Team OL/DL
 2004
 Sacks Season Leaders, 9.0
 Blocked Kicks Season Leaders, 3
 First Team All-Arena OL/DL
 All-Ironman Team OL/DL
 Lineman of the Year
 2005
 Blocked Kicks Season Leaders, 3
 Second Team All-Arena OL/DL
 Raymond Philyaw
 2004
 TD/Rush Pct. Season Leaders (min. 25 rushes), 32.4
 Dameon Porter
 2001
 Yards/Reception Season Leaders (min. 40 receptions), 16.3
 Interceptions Season Leaders, 12
 First Team All-Arena WR/DB
 All-Ironman Team WR/DB
 Breakout Player of the Year
 Ironman of the Year
 2002
 Interceptions Season Leaders, 10
 First Team All-Arena WR/DB
 All-Ironman Team WR/DB
 Dennison Robinson
 2006
 ArenaBowl XX Defensive Player of the Game
 2007
 Tackles Season Leaders, 95
 Bobby Sippio
 2007
 Receiving Yards Season Leaders, 1742
 Receiving TDs Season Leaders, 53 TDs
 TD/Reception Pct. Season Leaders (min. 40 receptions), 42.4
 First Team All-Arena WR
 Khreem Smith
 2006
 Forced Fumbles Season Leaders, 5
 Second Team All-Arena OL/DL
 All-Rookie Team OL/DL
 Jeremy Unertl
 2007
 Second Team All-Arena DB

Miscellaneous
 The Rush's official mascot was a construction worker named Grabowski, a reference to Chicago's blue collar background. The name was coined by Mike Ditka in January 1986 to describe the difference between his Chicago Bears and the Los Angeles Rams.
 Dancin' Steve was the original unofficial mascot for the Chicago Rush Arena Football team. He made his first appearance at the premier game March 30, 2001.
 Instead of the nickname Rush, the team was originally going to be called the Chicago Paytons to honor the late Walter Payton, who, along with Ditka, was to be part owner of the team.
 The Rush shared the Allstate Arena with the DePaul Blue Demons men's basketball team and the Chicago Wolves hockey team. In addition to pro sports, the arena often hosted the Ringling Bros. and Barnum & Bailey Circus, as well as concerts, rodeos and professional wrestling.
 The Rush were the first Arena Football team to be featured in a "This Is SportsCenter" ad on ESPN. In the ad, SportsCenter anchor John Anderson mediates a therapeutic sit-down discussion in which Rush receiver Damian Harrell tells quarterback Sherdrick Bonner that he feels like he never gets the ball. When Bonner interrupts to tell him that he's not always open, Anderson chides him saying "Who has the ball right now?" "Damian has the ball."
 On May 19, 2008, the Rush wore black jerseys, black pants and silver helmets in a game against the Los Angeles Avengers. The Rush won 72–28. The game was televised on ESPN2. Coincidentally, the Rush wore black jerseys for the second time in Week 2 of the 2011 season, March 18, 2011 against the Philadelphia Soul, and the games were very similar. The Rush blew out the Soul 62–28 after going up 40-14 by halftime.
 On April 14, 2013, the Rush set a franchise record by holding the Pittsburgh Power scoreless in the first half en route to a 45–14 win. It was the first meeting in history between the two teams.

Season-by-season

References

General

Specific

External links 

 Chicago Rush at ArenaFan.com

 
2001 establishments in Illinois
2013 disestablishments in Illinois